François Désiré Breton (1 May 1781, Sainte-Rose, Guadeloupe - 15 April 1820, Les Cayes, Haiti) was a French naval officer.

Career 
In 1800, aged 19, Breton departed Le Havre on Géographe as an ensign First Class to take part in Baudin expedition of 1800 to 1802. On 29 October 1801, at Timor, he transferred to Naturaliste. Aboard, he was appreciated by ensign Henri de Freycinet, though Baudin himself labeled him "the most useless of all aboard, and that is saying something".

In 1803, Breton served in the Indian Ocean, captaining the frigate Manche.

Notes and references

References

Bibliography 
 
 
 

1781 births
1820 deaths
French Navy officers
French sailors
People from Sainte-Rose, Guadeloupe